Massachusetts House of Representatives' 12th Norfolk district in the United States is one of 160 legislative districts included in the lower house of the Massachusetts General Court. It covers part of Norfolk County. Democrat John Rogers of Norwood has represented the district since 1993. Candidates running for this district seat in the 2020 Massachusetts general election include Mike Dooley.

Towns represented
The district includes the following localities:
 Norwood
 part of Walpole

The current district geographic boundary overlaps with those of the Massachusetts Senate's Bristol and Norfolk district and Norfolk and Suffolk district.

Former locales
The district previously covered:
 Foxborough, circa 1872 
 Medway, circa 1872 
 Wrentham, circa 1872

Representatives
 William B. Boyd, circa 1858 
 Daniels Carpenter, circa 1858 
 Edward C. Craig, circa 1859 
 William H. Temple, circa 1859 
 Maurice E. Ronayne, Jr., circa 1975 
 Gregory Sullivan
 John H. Rogers, 1993-current

See also
 List of Massachusetts House of Representatives elections
 Other Norfolk County districts of the Massachusetts House of Representatives: 1st, 2nd, 3rd, 4th, 5th, 6th, 7th, 8th, 9th, 10th, 11th, 13th, 14th, 15th
 List of Massachusetts General Courts
 List of former districts of the Massachusetts House of Representatives

Images
Portraits of legislators

References

Further reading

External links
 Ballotpedia
  (State House district information based on U.S. Census Bureau's American Community Survey).
 League of Women Voters of Norwood
 League of Women Voters of Westwood-Walpole-Dedham

House
Government of Norfolk County, Massachusetts